John (Johnny) Graves (19 January 1926 – 23 July 1983) was an Australian rugby league footballer who played in the 1940s and 1950s. An Australian international representative goal-kicking , he played his club football for the South Sydney Rabbitohs, with whom he won back-to-back premierships in 1950–51.

Club career

Known as "Whacka", Graves commenced his footballing in Newcastle, New South Wales and came to the attention of Sydney talent scouts when he scored two tries in his international debut representing Newcastle against a touring British side in 1946.

Graves joined South Sydney in 1947 and after only four first grade games was selected for New South Wales. He formed a strong backline pairing with Clive Churchill and was victorious in Grand Finals with Souths in 1950 (scoring two tries) and in 1951 (scoring four tries).

Graves was appointed captain-coach of Cootamundra in 1954. The team won the Group 9 premiership.

Representative career
He debuted for Australia against New Zealand in the 1st Test of 1948, played in the rest of that series and then toured Great Britain with the 1948 Kangaroos. He played in two Tests and twenty tour games returning as the side's top scorer with 16 tries and 35 goals for 188 points.

He represented for Australia in seven Test matches (3 Great Britain, 3 New Zealand and 1 France) between 1948 and 1951. He was selected to represent Sydney against France during their 1951 tour of Australasia in a match that ended in a 19-all draw.

Records
He was the NSW Rugby Football League's top try-scorer season 1951 and his achievement that year of 28 tries in 17 games still stands in 5th place on the overall Australian list of Most Tries by an Individual in a Season. As of 2021, his record of four tries in a Grand Final, also achieved that season still stands.

He holds positions 1, 2, 4 and 5 in the table of Most Points in a Match for the Rabbitohs with respectively 29 points (Round 8, 1952 v Easts); 27 points (Round 14, 1949 v Easts); 23 points(Round 18, 1952 v Newtown) and 23 points (Round 10, 1948 v Parramatta).

Along with five other Rabbitohs he has achieved the feat of scoring five tries in a single match (Round 14, 1949 v Easts.)

Footnotes

Published sources
 Andrews, Malcolm (2006) The ABC of Rugby League, Austn Broadcasting Corpn, Sydney
 NRL Official 2007 Season Guide, News Magazines Surry Hills Sydney, for the National Rugby League

1926 births
1983 deaths
Australia national rugby league team players
Australian rugby league players
Maitland Pickers players
Newcastle rugby league team players
Rugby league players from Maitland, New South Wales
Rugby league wingers
South Sydney Rabbitohs players